The Rockall Trough is a deep-water bathymetric feature to the northwest of Scotland and Ireland, running roughly from southwest to northeast, flanked on the north by the Rockall Plateau and to the south by the Porcupine Seabight. At the northern end, the channel is bounded by the Wyville-Thomson Ridge, named after Charles Wyville Thomson, professor of zoology at the University of Edinburgh and driving force behind the Challenger Expedition. At the southern end, the trough opens into the Porcupine abyssal plain. The Rockall Basin (also known as the Hatton Rockall Basin) is a large (c. 800 km by 150 km) sedimentary basin that lies beneath the trough. Both are named after Rockall, a rocky islet lying 301.4 km west of St Kilda.

Features of the Rockall Plateau have been officially named after features of Middle-earth in the fiction of J. R. R. Tolkien, e.g. Eriador Seamount, Rohan Seamount, Gondor Seamount, Fangorn Bank, Edoras Bank, Lorien Knoll, Isengard Ridge.

Geological structure
The nature of the crust beneath the Rockall Trough has long been a matter of debate. Originally thought to be oceanic crust it is now generally considered to be highly stretched continental crust, although some groups of researchers continue to favour either oceanic or transitional style crust, particularly at the southern end of the basin.

The Rockall Basin forms part of a chain of highly extended Mesozoic rift basins between the Charlie-Gibb and Senja Fracture Zones, that includes; the Faroe-Shetland Basin, the Møre Basin, and the Vøring Basin. There are indications that the Rockall Basin developed within an earlier rift system, which is likely to be of Triassic to Middle Jurassic in age, by analogy with the nearby Slyne-Erris Basins. The age of the main rift phase in the Rockall Basin is strongly debated, with Late Jurassic, Early-, Mid- and Late Cretaceous all being suggested.

One of the features of the Rockall Trough is the Anton Dohrn Seamount. It lies  beneath the surface, rising  from the surrounding seabed. The plateau formed approximately 55 million years ago, a continental fragment formed between Greenland and Europe when the ancient continent of Laurasia was split apart by plate tectonics. The Rockall Islet is the highest point of the plateau, rising 21 m above sealevel. It is made of a type of peralkaline granite.

Economic geology
To date, there has been comparatively little drilling to explore for oil and gas within the Rockall Basin and only two discoveries have been made, Benbecula in the northern UK Rockall (Shell originally Enterprise Oil) and Dooish in the northern Irish Rockall (Shell originally Enterprise Energy Ireland). The discoveries show that, at least locally, there is a working petroleum system. Rights to exploit these resources are disputed between the United Kingdom, the Republic of Ireland, Iceland and the Faroe Islands (a possession of Denmark). This topic is addressed in Rockall Bank dispute.

Ecology

The area supports cold water coral colonies and carbonate mound fields such as the Logachev Mounds; the trough supports a rich deep sea fish population. There are also unusual aggregations of deep-sea sponges, in particular the encrusting sponge and bird's nest sponge. A range of other species are found amongst the sponges beds, which are considered biodiversity hotspots. For the bird's nest sponge associated species include ascidians, Foraminifera, polychaetes and burrowing anemones, whilst for the encrusting sponge beds species such as anemones, ascidians, crinoids and ophiuroids are found. The area is also home to brittlestars: filter feeders which live on the seabed.

The MPA is designated a Category IV protected area by the International Union for Conservation of Nature.

See also
 Hatton Basin
 Porcupine Seabight
 Slyne-Erris Basin

References

R.S.Haszeldine and M.J.Russell. 1987. The Late Carboniferous northern North Atlantic Ocean: implications for hydrocarbon exploration from Britain to the Arctic. In: J.Brooks and K.W.Glennie (Eds) Petroleum Geology of North West Europe, Graham and Trotman, London, 1163–1175.
D.Naylor, P.M.Shannon and N.Murphy. 1999. Irish Rockall Basin region – a standard structural nomenclature system. Petroleum Affairs Division, Dublin, Special Publications. 1/99.
N.C.Morewood, G.D.Mackenzie, P.M.Shannon, B.M.O'Reilly, P.W.Readman and J.Makris. 2005. The crustal structure and regional development of the Irish Atlantic Margin. In: A.G.Dore and B.A.Vining (Eds) Petroleum Geology: North-West Europe and Global Perspectives – Proceedings of the 6th Petroleum Geology Conference, 1023–1033, Geological Society, London.

External links
 Friendsoftheirishenvironment.net: Rockall Basin
 Pip.ie:  Rockall Basin

Sedimentary basins of Europe
Geology of Ireland
Geology of Scotland
Coasts of Ireland
Scottish coast
Rockall
Geography of Ireland
Geography of Northern Ireland
Geography of Scotland
Landforms of Ireland
Landforms of Northern Ireland
Landforms of Scotland
Economic geology
Fishing in Scotland
Mesozoic rifts and grabens
Nature Conservation Marine Protected Areas of Scotland
Rift basins